Zinc finger and BTB domain-containing protein 20 is a protein that in humans is encoded by the ZBTB20 gene.

There is evidence that ZBTB20 may cause primrose disease.

References

Further reading

External links 
 

Transcription factors